Sibilla has been borne by at least two ships of the Italian Navy and may refer to:

 , a  launched in 1943. 
 , a  launched in 1989 and sold in 2015 to Bangladesh for coastguard service. She was renamed CGS Tajuddin. 

Italian Navy ship names